The American live-action/animated 2001 film Osmosis Jones features a variety of fictional characters created by Marc Hyman. It followed up with American animated television series Ozzy & Drix which originally aired on Kids' WB from 2002 to 2004, shows a white blood cell police officer team up with a cold pill to defeat many germs and viruses. The series had twenty-six episodes in two seasons.

Main characters

Osmosis "Ozzy" Jones
Voiced By Chris Rock (film), Phil LaMarr (series)

Osmosis Jones is a white blood cell cop who wants to track down germs and viruses.

Drixenol "Drix" Koldreliff
Voiced By David Hyde Pierce (film), Jeff Bennett (series)

Drix is a cold pill and Ozzy's best friend and partner that is designed to soothe irritation within the cities of Frank and Hector.

Allies

Leah Estrogen
Voiced By Brandy Norwood

Leah Estrogen is the secretary of the mayor of Frank. She is romantic interest to Osmosis Jones who agreed with her on making changes to Frank's lifestyle choices.

Maria Amino
Voiced by Tasia Valenza

Maria Amino is a female Hispanic white blood cell cop who is highly skilled at fighting and the replacement for Leah. Despite showing her midriff, she's not drawn with a belly button. She also appears to have a crush on Drix.

Tom Colonic
Voiced By Ron Howard

Tom Colonic was the political opponent of Charles Phlegmming who wanted to be the next mayor of Frank so that the city will be healthy from a better diet. After Ozzy and Drix defeated Thrax and prevented his plan to kill Frank, resulting in Phlegmming's impeachment, he eventually won the bid for the mayor of Frank in a landslide. However, it is implied that he got impeached thanks to Frank's relapse to his unhealthy diet.

Mayor Paul Spryman
Voiced By Alanna Ubach

Mayor Paul Spryman is the teenage mayor of the City of Hector. His being a teenage boy is a reflection of the fact that Hector is a teenage boy.

Ellen Patella
Voiced by Vivica A. Fox

Ellen Patella is the attorney-at-law and helps cells find homes in the City of Hector. She, like Leah and Maria respectively, also seems like someone Osmosis takes a romantic interest in.

Cilia Tyson
Voiced by Dawnn Lewis

Cilia Tyson is a cop in Christine who helped Ozzy stop the Pneumoniac and prove that Maximus is a traitor to the city. She was made the new police chief by the mayor.

Mayor Conscious Santorini
Voiced by Cree Summer

Mayor Conscious Santorini is the mayor of Christine, and she is more smart and responsible than Spryman. She even said that everyone in Christine are fans of Hector.

Drixeen
Voiced by Miriam Flynn

Drixeen is a friend to Cilia and she used to a cold pill. She looks a bit like Drix except she's green instead of red, has hair, and a right hand and left cannon, while Drix is red, has no hair, and his arm positions are the other way.

Dander
Vocal Effects By Frank Welker

Dander is a dog germ formed from the saliva of Hector's dog Uno and Drix's pet.

Police chiefs

Chief
Voiced by Joel Silver (uncredited)

The Chief is Ozzy's boss in the City of Frank.

Chief Gluteus
Voiced by Jim Cummings

Chief Gluteus is a gruff old muscle cell and the police chief of the City of Hector. He has a burning hatred for Ozzy and Drix.

Germs

Thrax
Voiced By Laurence Fishburne

The main antagonist of Osmosis Jones. Thrax is a vile and sadistic virus determined to kill Frank DeTorre within 48 hours, so that he can set a record for the virus to kill a man the fastest and be written about in medical books, annoyed that his previous killings had gone uncredited; among them being a young girl who refused to regularly wash her hands. Thrax kills his victims by stealing their hypothalamus, which he stores inside a necklace. He has the ability to cause cells, germs, and objects to catch fire with his claw. After arriving via Frank eating a hard boiled egg contaminated by chimpanzee saliva and mud, Thrax murders the two workers that found him and sets their boat ablaze. Thrax then confronts local crime boss Scabies, and murders him and takes control of his gang after being mocked. After causing a runny nose by breaking the dam, Thrax attempts to expand his mob at a meeting at the Zit. Osmosis and Drix blow up the Zit and Thrax is presumed dead, but actually manages to escape. Despite being fired from the force by Mayor Phlegmming in spite of their warnings, Ozzy and Drix defy his orders to stop Thrax. Thrax murders his remaining gang and steals Frank's hypothalamus and escapes Frank's body, with his daughter, Shane, being his next hopeful target. However, Osmosis followed him and the two battled on Shane's fake eyelash. Osmosis steals the chain and traps Thrax on the fake eyelash, which falls into a beaker of rubbing alcohol, incinerating Thrax. Ozzy later returns the DNA bead to its rightful place and Frank recovers from his fever, resulting in him getting his job back and making Drix his new partner.

Charles Phlegmming
Voiced By William Shatner

The former mayor of the City of Frank and the secondary antagonist of Osmosis Jones. Responsible for Frank's unhealthy eating habits, he wanted to be reelected for his own selfish benefits, but in the end, he lost to his political opponent, Tom Colonic. Whenever reporters enter his office, he would always deny all the various problems in Frank's body, trying to assure them that his body is in perfect shape. After Frank ingested the tainted hard-boiled egg that caused him to contract Thrax, Phlegmming went out of his way to ignore and downplay the issue as nothing more but a cold, but Ozzy tried to warn him it was a lot serious than that, let alone deadly, with Phlegmming threatening  to put him in the next nosebleed if he ever spoke of it. He would also illegally control Frank's thoughts on a few occasions and made him take a cold pill against the wishes of his secretary, Leah, which is how Ozzy met, and joined forces with, Drix to stop Thrax's plan. After Ozzy and Drix uncovered Thrax's scheme after destroying a nightclub inside a zit on Frank's forehead, Phlegmming continued to ignore the warnings and fired Jones from the police force and ordered Drix to leave Frank's body by being peed out. Ozzy and Drix later reconciled and defied Phlegmming's orders to stop Thrax. After Leah tells him off for not caring about Frank's health and only caring about himself and his own selfish interests, including the election, Thrax infiltrates Frank's brain and steals a DNA chromosome from his hypothalamus gland, causing his body temperature to reach to a hazardous 108 degrees and sending him into a deadly coma. A trip to a chicken wing festival in Buffalo, New York, was Phlegmming's only shot of being reelected, but due to Thrax destroying the city and causing Frank's coma, it was quickly shot down when Frank was rushed to the hospital and all he could do was look on as the city burned to the ground. Ozzy later chases Thrax onto Frank's daughter, Shane's fake eyelash, where he recovers the DNA bead and traps Thrax on the eyelash, which falls into a vial of rubbing alcohol, dissolving Thrax to death, at which point he returns the stolen bead to its rightful place and Frank recovers from his fever, resulting in him getting his job back and making Drix his new partner. As for Phlegmming, Thrax's rampage resulted in a massive scandal that led up to his impeachment and removal from office, with Colonic winning the election in a landslide. Following his impeachment, Phlegmming was reduced to working as a custodian in Frank's bowels and while doing so, he accidentally presses a button that ejects himself from Frank's body via flatulence, causing his own implied demise.

Scarlet Fever
Voiced By Tim Curry

Scarlet Fever is a dangerous bacterium who has been pursued for years by Ozzy throughout the City of Frank. With new germs moving in as a result of Frank's bad habits, Scarlet Fever intends to leave and find new territory. During a confrontation with Ozzy and Drix, the three are sucked up by a mosquito and placed in Hector when the mosquito drinks his blood. Realizing Hector's youth will rejuvenate him, Scarlet Fever consumes a water-like substance that transforms him into a more powerful form. He begins attacking the city, planning to kill Hector. Although he manages to fend off the local white blood cells, Ozzy and Drix fend him off and Scarlet Fever hijacks an attack helicopter, intending to go to the heart. Osmosis takes control of the helicopter and redirects it to the spleen. Scarlet Fever takes back control of the helicopter and forces Ozzy out, but he is unable to escape the spleen and torn apart.

He is partially based on Thrax, with his abilities being very common.

Nick O'Teen
Voiced By Tim Curry

Nick O'Teen serves as the main antagonist of the season one episode "Where There's Smoke".

He is the nicotine of the cigarette that Hector smoked. He is accompanied by his allies Tar (Voiced by Frank Welker), Butane (Voiced by Jeff Bennett) and Carbon Monoxide (Voiced by Tara Strong).

Protozilla
Voiced by Frank Welker

Protozilla is an allergen with a weak form and a monster form with his monster form only usable in a body that's allergic to him.

Ernst Strepfinger
Voiced by Brad Garrett (season 1), Jim Cummings (season 2)

Ernst Strepfinger is a recurring villain shown throughout Ozzy & Drix starting with the episode "Strep-Finger". His surname is a mix of the condition strepthroat and the James Bond villain Auric Goldfinger, whilst his first name comes from fellow Bond villain Ernst Stavro Blofeld.

Sal Monella
Voiced by Henry Winkler

Sal Monella is a gangster germ who enters the City of Hector on a Rusty Dog, which Hector didn't know that it was tainted, and plans to dump illegal toxic waste in Hector's stomach. To make matters worse, Mayor Spryman was in his hostage. But his plans were destroyed when Ozzy and Drix made Hector barf by going on a ride at Rustyland called "The Barfy Bungee", and the mayor was rescued and brought back to the city.

Sylvian Fisher
Voiced by Brian Posehn

Sylvian Fisher is a nerdy brain cell who was trying to become mayor in the upcoming election. He planned to use a growth formula to make Hector grow uncontrollably and blame it on Spryman's carelessness. His name comes from the Sylvian fissure brain area and his transformed appearance resembles the Incredible Hulk, but with orange skin instead of green.

Stickety Lipid
Voiced by Rob Paulsen

Stickety Lipid is a sticky and bad cholesterol beatnik who kidnaps a bunch of fat cell kids in an attempt to clog Hector's artery.

Smirch
Voiced by Danny Bonaduce

Smirch is an acne germ that plans to make Hector get a zit. He also managed to trick Drix when he wanted to learn how to be "Street Wise". Actually, Drix helped him to get into a sebum oil refinery, so, he had an opportunity to grow gigantic and give Hector a zit, right on School Picture Day. Then Drix defeats him by dropping sodium bicarbonate toothpaste on him, shrinking him down to a tiny size, then Chief Gluteus put him in his shirt pocket.

General Malaise
Voiced by Charlie Adler

General Malaise is a bacterium who uses sugar to make his army of bacteria multiply.

Rhoda Virus
Voiced by Justine Bateman

Rhoda Virus is an intestinal virus who plans on giving Hector a bad case of gastroenteritis. Unfortunately, for her, Hector had a 12-bean salad, which gave him a gas attack, and the gas is deadly to her and her gang, so Rhoda disguises herself as a submarine captain to take Ozzy, Drix, and Maria into the intestines to destroy the Great White Bean. In the end, she and her henchmen are trapped in a gas bubble, killing them.

Cryo
Voiced by Susan Silo

Cryo is a virus that once tried to give Hector hypothermia, despite the fact that hypothermia is when the core temperatures of the body decrease to a critical level. Therefore, it is not a disease. She has the ability to fire freezing blasts from her elbows. She was eventually destroyed when struck by a nerve impulse from Hector's spine.

Chief Maximus 
Voiced by Rob Paulsen

The Chief of Police in the city of Christine (a girl that Hector likes) that teams up with the Pneumoniac, due to his disillusion of being a male cell in a female body.

The Pneumoniac
Voiced by Pat Fraley

The Pneumoniac is a germ who is planning to give Christine pneumonia.

Mother Louse
Mother Louse is a head louse that laid her eggs on Hector's hair. She fell to her death when Drix got too close to one of Hector's hairs, but he caught Ozzy just in time and then he and Ozzy went into Hector's right ear.

Mother Worm
Voiced by Frank Welker

Mother Worm is a Trichinella spiralis worm from the undercooked sausage Hector ate.

Shane
Voiced by Danny Cooksey

Shane is  a hormone leader of a testosterone gang that once tied up Mayor Spryman and took control over the Brain, turning common sense off and transforming Hector into a bad kid.

Scabies
Voiced by David Ossman

Scabies is a bacterium and gang boss who lives in the left armpit of the city of Frank. Thrax arrives at the armpit shortly after entering the body and asks Scabies and his men, who are in a sauna, to join him. Scabies instead mocks him and orders Bruiser to beat him and bury him alive in a blackhead; Thrax breaks Bruiser's arm, and Scabies sends the rest of his men after him. Thrax uses his claws to fill the room with steam, and slices Scabies in half. Scabies melts from Thrax's touch, but he continues to mock Thrax as his melted remains are sucked down a drain.

Billy Bob Bile
Voiced by Frank Welker

Billy Bob Bile is a stereotypical Hillbilly and owner of an appendix hotel who was causing detours which it resulted in Hector's appendix almost bursting. Only a quick trip to a hospital saved Hector's life and then the doctor there removed Billy's hotel. Billy attempted to return to civilization, only to cause Ozzy and Drix to slap cuffs on his wrists. When he tries to escape, he took a trip to the Small Intestine.

Mitosis Jones
Voiced by Phil LaMarr

Mitosis Jones is Ozzy's evil and mutated clone who understands that due to his mutation, the City of Hector will reject him. So he plans to take Ozzy's place on the iodine detail and steal it, and without the iodine, Hector cannot grow. At the end of the episode, Mitosis was rejected and lived in the body of Uno, Hector's pet dog, where he was happy.

PB
Voiced by Jeff Bennett

PB is the leader of the Lead Head gang. He was from a lead-painted shed that was painted in the 1960s, before 1974, when the government banned lead in paint. When Hector sniffed some paint dust, PB and his boys infect Hector. But thanks to Ozzy, Drix, and the Supplements, the Lead Heads were dropped into the bladder, and flushed out of Hector.

Professor Nightmare
Voiced by Pat Fraley

Professor Nightmare is a nightmare that originated from a movie Hector saw. Ozzy and Drix enter Hector's dreams and help him overcome his fear and crush him. He was the first villain to be based on a subconscious thought rather than being a germ or disease.

Bruiser
Voiced by Herschel Sparber

Bruiser is a one-eyed germ with four arms.

He used to work for Scabies until the bacteria was killed by Thrax. He eventually became convinced on Thrax's plans. He was one of two germs killed by Thrax once the latter lost his patience.

Joe Cramp
Voiced by Rodger Bumpass

Joe Cramp is a germ with eyes hidden under a black blindfold and three legs.

He used to work for Scabies until the bacteria was killed by Thrax. He eventually became convinced on Thrax's plans. He was one of two germs killed by Thrax once the latter lost his patience.

Humans

Frank DeTorri/e
Played By Bill Murray (film), Voiced By Jeff Bennett (series, uncredited)

Frank DeTorri is an unhealthy zookeeper from Rhode Island. Unhappy with the death of his wife, he refuses to exercise and eats whatever he wants, with little to no cleanliness. Once he ate a hard-boiled egg that was put into a chimp's mouth and fell on the ground, he contracted Thrax, which made him have a terrible fever that almost killed him. Once he recovered, his daughter, Shane made him have a healthy diet. However, it shortly relapsed (possible that this a different version versus the movie). At the beginning of the cartoon series, he was worse in shape (due to his poor eating habits) and bitten by a mosquito that Ozzy, Drix, and Scarlet Fever were sucked up and transferred to Hector's body. Frank later made a small cameo as one of the citizens in Rusty's Ridetropolis in "The Globfather". He is the only human from the original life-action/animation-crossover movie to be seen in the animated television series.

Shane DeTorri
Played by Elena Franklin

Shane is the daughter of Frank Detorri, who cared about her father's health and diet.

Bob DeTorri
Played By Chris Elliott

Robert DeTorre is a zookeeper at Rhode Island and Frank DeTorre's brother.

Mrs. Boyd
Played by Molly Shannon

Mrs. Boyd is Shane's science and P.E. teacher who is a figure of humiliation, thanks to Frank who accidentally threw up on her after eating a polluted oyster at a school science fair two years earlier, which results in her filing a 200-yard restraining order against him while her two young sons Ralph and Chuck endure constant teasing from other children and her daughter Shirley, who is nicknamed Hurley, keeps transferring schools.

Hector Cruz
Voiced By Justin Cowden

A Hispanic-American 13-year-old boy whose body is the current residence of Osmosis and Drix and whose body the show takes place in.

Travis Lum
Voiced by Rob Paulsen

Travis Lum is Hector's classmate and best friend who looks out for him. He sometimes likes to make mean jokes about Hector but also comes out as a true friend in the end.

Christine Kolchuck
Voiced by Kimberly Brooks

Christine Kolchuck is Hector's classmate and love interest. She tries to look after Hector's health and his attitude and also looks out for him.

School Teacher
She is Hector's school teacher in the T.V. series Ozzy and Drix. She is unnamed and uncredited in all the episodes she appears in. It is implied she is French due to her speaking with the appropriate accent.

References

Lists of characters in American television animation
Lists of animated film characters
Lists of film characters
Characters